The Freethinking Atheist and Agnostic Kinship or FAAK is a Capistrano Valley High School club. The club, created in 2007, has stirred controversy within the Orange County, California community.

Purpose
Surveys show that atheists, agnostics and freethinkers are the least trusted group of people. The primary purpose of Freethinking Atheist and Agnostic Kinship is to improve this image through activism and community service.

Media attention
The Freethinking Atheist and Agnostic Kinship has been featured in the Orange County Weekly, Orange County Register and national TV's The O'Reilly Factor. In addition, the club has organized several rallies each drawing over 200 picketers. These rallies have landed on the front pages of Orange County Register and Los Angeles Times.

Accomplishments
FAAK has brought a local college professor to Capistrano Valley High School.

FAAK was named Club of the Year in 2007-2008 for its activism and excellence in community service.

Notes and references

Agnosticism
Atheist organizations